This is a list of existing airlines in Poland.

Scheduled airlines

Charter airlines

Cargo airlines

See also
 List of defunct airlines of Poland
 List of airports in Poland
 List of defunct airlines of Europe

References

Poland
Airlines
Airlines
Poland